The Ticino Valley Natural Park is a nature reserve\regional park in Piedmont, Italy.

It is an riverine park that forms a greenway outside of Milan, near Pavia and Varese. It is located along the Ticino. Inhabiting the park are foxes, badgers, weasels, skunks, and martens, along with reintroduced European otters and roe deer. It is a notable fishing and birdwatching locale. Located in the park are Bernate Ticino and Morimondo Abbey.

References 

Parks in Piedmont
Tourist attractions in Piedmont